Alejalil Hospital is a general hospital and the only hospital in Aq Qala, Iran, founded in 2021 by Habib Alejalil, an Iranian philanthropist.

References

External links 
Alejalil Hospital

Location of Alejalil Hospital

Hospitals in Golestan province
Hospital buildings completed in 2005
hospitals in Iran
Hospitals established in 2005